William Castle (1914–1977) was an American film director, producer, and actor.

William Castle may also refer to:

William Castle (shipbuilder) (c. 1615-1681) English shipbuilder for the Royal Navy
William Castle (tenor) (1836–1909), English tenor active in the United States
William B. Castle (1814–1872), American politician from Ohio
William Bosworth Castle (1897–1990), American physician and physiologist
William E. Castle (1867–1962), American geneticist
William Richards Castle (1849–1935), lawyer, politician and Attorney General of Hawaii
William Richards Castle Jr. (1878–1963), U.S. educator, diplomat and ambassador to Japan